The Very Best of War is a double CD compilation by War which features tracks from 1970 to 1994.  It was issued in 2003 on Avenue Records, distributed by Rhino Records, and is similar to an earlier compilation, Anthology 1970–1994 issued in 1994 by the same label.

The Very Best of War track listing

Disc one

Disc two

Anthology track listing

Disc one

Disc two

References

War (American band) albums
1994 greatest hits albums
2004 greatest hits albums